Gian Chand Gupta is an Indian politician presently working as Speaker of Haryana Legislative Assembly from the Bharatiya Janata Party representing the Panchkula constituency in Haryana.

On 4 November 2019, he was unanimously elected the Speaker of Haryana Legislative Assembly.

Political career
State President B.J.P State Chandigarh (U.T.) during 1991-92, 1993–95, 1995–97,
Mayor, Municipal Corporation, Chandigarh (U.T.) from 23.12.1997 to  23.12.1998
State Treasurer, Bhartiya Janata Party, Haryana Pradesh during 2002-2005, 2009-2012.
State Vice President, Bhartiya *Janata Party 2006-2008, Haryana State. 
State Convener “Ajeewan Sahyog Nidhi” Haryana Pradesh 
Chairman, Public Accounts Committee, Haryana Vidhan Sabha from 24.04.2015 to 26.10.2019. 
Government Chief Whip, Haryana from 08.03.2016 to 26.10.2019.
Speaker, Haryana Legislative Assembly since 4 November 2019
Mla from Panchkula City he belongs to BJP.

References

Living people
Bharatiya Janata Party politicians from Haryana
People from Panchkula
Haryana MLAs 2019–2024
1948 births